Taehong Cho (born 1966) is a Korean linguist and Professor of Linguistics (HYU Distinguished Research Fellow) at Hanyang University. He is the editor-in-chief of the Journal of Phonetics and a member of the editorial board of Laboratory Phonology. Cho is known for his works on phonetics, laboratory phonology, speech production and speech perception.

Select publications
 The Effects of Prosody on Articulation in English, Routledge 2002
 Cho, T., & Ladefoged, P. (1999). Variation and universals in VOT: evidence from 18 languages. Journal of Phonetics, 27(2), 207–229. doi:10.1006/jpho.1999.0094 
 Cho, T., Jun, S.-A., & Ladefoged, P. (2002). Acoustic and aerodynamic correlates of Korean stops and fricatives. Journal of Phonetics, 30(2), 193–228. doi:10.1006/jpho.2001.0153 (https://doi.org/10.1006/jpho.2001.0153)

References

External links
 Prof. Taehong Cho

Living people

1966 births
Phoneticians
Phonologists
Linguistics journal editors
Cognitive scientists
Max Planck Institutes researchers
Academic staff of Hanyang University
University of California, Los Angeles alumni
Psycholinguists